The Killer Kowalski Cup Tournament is a professional wrestling round-robin tag team tournament held by Top Rope Promotions.

The Kowalski Cup is held under a points system, with two points for a win, one for a draw and none for a loss. The team finishing atop the points standings are the winners. Matches in the Tenkaichi Jr. have a 30-minute time limit.

Format
Wrestlers compete in a variety of "qualifying" matches, usually either singles matches or tag team matches, with the winner(s) of each match advancing to an elimination match where the last remaining competitor would be deemed the Killer Kowalski Cup Tournament winner

List of winners
2006 – Mike Bennett
2007 – BK Jordan
2008 – Jason Blade
2009 – Stevie Richards
2010 – Matt Taven
2011 – Matt Magnum
2012 – Vinny Marseglia
2013 – Biff Busick
2014 – Nick Steel
2015 – Vinny Marseglia
2016 – Nico Silva

Tournament results

References

Professional wrestling tournaments